The Dutch Eerste Divisie in the 1985–86 season was contested by 19 teams, one more than in the previous season. This was due to FC Emmen entering from the amateurs. FC Den Haag won the championship without losing a single match.

New entrants
Entered from amateur football
 FC Emmen
Relegated from the 1984–85 Eredivisie
 NAC Breda
 PEC Zwolle
 FC Volendam

League standings

Promotion competition
In the promotion competition, four period winners (the best teams during each of the four quarters of the regular competition) played for promotion to the eredivisie.

See also
 1985–86 Eredivisie
 1985–86 KNVB Cup

References
Netherlands - List of final tables (RSSSF)

Eerste Divisie seasons
2
Neth